The Thessaloniki Metro is an underground rapid-transit system under construction in Thessaloniki, Greece's second largest city. Estimates for the cost of the megaproject are €1.62 billion ($ billion) for the main line and €640 million ($ million) for the Kalamaria extension, for a total of €2.26 billion ($ billion). The project is primarily funded with loans from the European Investment Bank (EIB) and the European Regional Development Fund (ERDF) and funds from the Greek government. Construction by a Greek-Italian consortium is overseen by Attiko Metro S.A., the Greek state-owned company which oversaw construction of the Athens Metro and Athens Tram.

Proposed during the 1910s and first seriously planned in the 1980s, construction of the main line began in 2006 and on the Kalamaria extension in 2013. Although the initial proposal included three extensions to the main line, the latest Attiko Metro proposal seeks to combine the two westward extensions as a loop; the system will be made up of the main line and the Kalamaria and Evosmos extensions. Detailed planning of the airport extension went to tender in March 2019, while the Western loop went to tender in August of the same year.

After years of delays, due mainly to archaeological discoveries in the city centre during construction and in part to the Greek financial crisis, the main line is scheduled to open in November 2023. The system will be entirely driverless and remote-controlled.

History

1918 and 1988 proposals

Ernest Hébrard and Thomas Hayton Mawson were the first to propose the creation of a metro system in Thessaloniki in 1918 as part of a commission appointed by the government of Eleftherios Venizelos to redesign the city after the Great Fire of 1917, which had devastated the city centre. They proposed an underground rail line to allow easy access from the city centre to the planned outskirts of the city in the east. Although Thessaloniki has grown considerably since Hébrard's original design, Line 1 is almost identical to his plan and runs from his proposed New Railway Station to the suburb of Nea Elvetia. The project never materialised. A circular metro line was proposed in 1968, extending to the airport and crossing the Thermaic Gulf in a tunnel.

The idea of a metro was revived during the 1980s. In 1988, under Mayor Sotiris Kouvelas, the city published studies for its Thessaloniki Metro development plan and construction of the project's first phase. The line was almost identical to the modern line, with 14 stations between the New Railway Station and Nea Elvetia. The network would be within the city limits, excluding Kalamaria and a large portion of Thessaloniki's metropolitan area.

In 1989, construction began on the first  of tunnel along Egnatia street between the Thessaloniki International Fair grounds and Aristotle University of Thessaloniki (the present  station). Construction was carried out with the cut-and-cover method instead of a tunnel boring machine. The proposed metro was only  beneath ground level at  but dropped to about  towards the New Railway Station, creating archaeological problems similar to those encountered during construction of the current system. Although construction was scheduled to end in 1995, the project stalled and the unfinished (but excavated) initial cut-and-cover section became known as "the hole of Kouvelas" (i trypa tou Kouvela). The project ultimately failed due to a series of unsuccessful contract competitions and appeals of awarded contracts. Another obstacle was lack of interest by Greece's central government. Thessaloniki attempted to fund the project on its own, saying that European Union member states were prepared to cover 50 percent of the project costs and provide favourable loans for the remainder, but without the central-government's involvement the plan did not go forward. One reason for the lack of central-government support was Greece's political polarisation during the 1980s; Kouvelas represented the centre-right New Democracy party when the country was governed by the Panhellenic Socialist Movement. Plans for a Thessaloniki metro were abandoned until the 2000s.

Final proposal

In 2018, Attiko Metro S.A. was overseeing the construction of a two-line, twin-tunnel system composed of Line 1 (the base project) and Line 2 (the Kalamaria Extension). Although Line 1 has been delayed by extensive archaeological works, Line 2's construction is proceeding on schedule. Construction of tunnels for both lines was finished in 2018, and track-laying began in August of that year. Line 1 and Line 2 will be operational by November 2023. Both lines are designed to serve a minimum of 18,000 passengers per hour in each direction, with a 90-second headway. The completed metro will reduce Thessaloniki's greenhouse gas emissions by an estimated 5,000 tons a year, and reduce travel time by up to 66 percent.

Network

Line 1 (Base Project)

What is known as the Base Project began in 2003, when Attiko Metro and the Greek government agreed to cooperate on a public works project Government support was instrumental, since lack of government support for the 1988 proposal was the primary reason it had failed. The project issued a request for tender in 20042005, and the successful Greco-Italian consortium (which included AnsaldoBreda) began construction in late June 2006. An alternate consortium, Macedonian Metro, was barred by the European Court of Justice from participating in the tender because it changed its composition after the tender proceedings began (violating EU law). The project was budgeted at €1.05 billion ($ billion), with 25 percent funding from the Greek government and 75 percent funded by loans from the European Investment Bank and the European Regional Development Fund. The latest available Attiko Metro financial data put the official estimated cost at €1.28 billion ($ billion). An April 2019 update raised the estimated cost to €1.62 billion ($ billion). Line 1 runs within the municipality of Thessaloniki, the core of the Thessaloniki urban area, calling at 13 stations.

Although construction began in 2006, major archaeological finds in the city centre delayed the project considerably. Disputes between Attiko Metro, the city council, and archaeologists reached Greece's Council of State, the country's highest administrative court, in 2015. The original schedule had Line 1 operational by 2012. Attiko Metro redesigned several stations in a solution which became known as "antiquities and metro". Some finds discovered on the line will be put on display at permanent in-station exhibitions, while the major discoveries at  will make up the world's first publicly-accessible open-air archaeological site contained in situ within a metro station.

Construction of the tunnels was completed on 31 July 2018, 12 years and one month after breaking ground. That day, the architectural work on Line 1 was reported as 80 percent finished. In August 2018, tracks and electronic signalling equipment began installation. By February 2019 construction on the main line was 95 percent completed and platform screen doors were beginning to be installed, while the Supreme Council for Civil Personnel Selection was planning a competition to fill the first 28 Thessaloniki Metro employee positions.

The new Minister of Infrastructure and Transport announced that the government had decided to scrap the previous plan to keep the archaeological discoveries in situ within the station at Venizelou, choosing instead to disassemble them and re-assemble them at a later stage, noting that excavation costs had exceeded €130 million ($ million), more than the cost of the new Acropolis Museum. Thessaloniki's new conservative mayor, Konstantinos Zervas, as well as Prime Minister Konstantinos Mitsotakis, supported this move. Mitsotakis also announced at the Thessaloniki International Fair that a new archaeological museum would be built specifically to house archaeological artefacts unearthed during the construction of the metro. The new head of Attiko Metro accused archaeologists of "looking to the past; we need to look forward".

The decision to disassemble the archaeological finds, dubbed a "Byzantine Pompeii", was strongly criticised, and a citizens' group has taken the government to court over the issue for a second time, supported by former mayor Yiannis Boutaris among others. Part of the objection has to do with the fact that the government has not carried out any studies as to how it will return and re-assemble the artefacts once the station has been built; this course of action was adopted for the construction of Aghia Sofia station, where the archaeological discoveries were more significant than those at Venizelou, but the re-assembly of the artefacts on site is now impossible because Attiko Metro never constructed any space dedicated to the re-assembly of the artefacts it disassembled, despite having promised to do so. In April 2020, the International Association of Byzantine Studies (AIEB) wrote to Prime Minister Mitsotakis to protest the removal of the antiquities from their original location, saying that the discoveries constituted "a cultural and scientific jewel" and that "it would be a tragedy to jeopardise [Greece's reputation for monument preservation] by squandering the treasure of the Thessaloniki material and data through an unnecessarily hasty construction project", arguing that the previous decision to leave the discoveries in-situ was preferable.

Line 2 (Kalamaria Extension)

The Kalamaria Extension extends the metro system to Kalamaria, the second-largest municipality in the Thessaloniki urban area and the 18th-most-populous in Greece. Construction on the project began in 2013, with an budget of €518 million ($ million). By 31 July 2018, the extension was 60 percent completed. Although construction began seven years after Line 1, it is expected to fully enter service in November 2023. This is due to the lack of major archaeological works, enabling the project to proceed without delays. The latest Attiko Metro financial statement puts the extension's costs at €568 million ($ million). An April 2019 update raised the estimated cost to €640 million ($ million). The line is made up of 16 stations, 11 of which are also stations served by Line 1.

The extension of Line 2 to Makedonia Airport went to tender in March 2019 with an initial budget of €254,150 ($ thousand) for topographical works in order to enable more detailed planning of the line.

Future extensions

The system is planned to be extended further, with a four-station eastern extension to Line 2 (towards Macedonia International Airport) and an eight-station loop in the west. Work on the western extensions was scheduled to enter the tendering process in the autumn 2018. Attiko Metro confirmed in early 2019 that preliminary works for the western loop will begin in 2019.

According to Attiko Metro, the double-track airport extension will be a mixture of underground, grade-level, and elevated railway elements. It may be extended south to better serve commuters to and from Chalkidiki. The western loop will be extended with three branches, adding four stations. Detailed planning of the eastern extension to the airport is set to begin in March 2019 and be finished in time for the project to be financed as part of the 20212027 funding cycle of the European Regional Development Fund. This happened on 18 March. The proposed route starts at the airport and follows Greek National Road 67 before joining Greek National Road 16 and then connecting with  station and the rest of Line 2.

Operations

Stations, depot and rolling stock

All 18 stations currently under construction were designed with platform screen doors for maximum protection, while the trains will be driverless. Eighteen Hitachi Rail Italy Driverless Metro units will be in service on Line 1, and 15 on Line 2. They will have seating for 96 passengers and standing room for 370 more. A carriage was on display at the September 2018 Thessaloniki International Fair before trial runs in 2019. As of August 2019 two complete train sets have been delivered to the depot, with an additional train set expected every 2 to 3 months. The system's level of automation has prompted Attiko Metro to call it "the most modern metro in Europe".

Apart from being the system's automated remote control command centre, the complex will also house the offices of Attiko Metro, the Thessaloniki Transport Authority (TheTA), and the Thessaloniki Metro operating company, as well as railway stock maintenance facilities, two restaurants, and a crèche. It is expected that the development of the depot will attract investment to the area, and there have been calls to make provisions for a passenger station at the depot. The depot complex is expected to be finished in May 2019.

Fares and park and ride

Attiko Metro conducted a 2005 survey to determine Thessaloniki residents' preferred fare for the metro compared to the standard price of a Thessaloniki Urban Transport Organization (OASTH) bus ticket (€0.50 at the time). Of the 400 respondents, 47.6 percent said that they were willing to pay the same price and 48.1 percent said they would pay more. Of the latter, 19.9 percent said that they would pay €0.60; 19.6 percent would pay €0.70, and 8.6 percent would be willing to pay €1.00 (double the cost of a bus ticket). The remaining 4.7 percent responded with another fare. A standard 2023 single-trip OASTH bus ticket is €0.90, or €0.45 with a discount.

Thessaloniki Metro will utilise an electronic card ticketing system as well as fare gates, a system not originally implemented on the Athens Metro.

Archaeology

A large number of important archaeological finds, primarily Roman and early Christian and Byzantine, have been discovered during the metro's construction. The project triggered the largest archaeological dig in northern Greek history, covering a  area. Between the New Railway Station and Sintrivani/Ekthesi, the metro runs below Egnatia Street (one of Thessaloniki's main arteries). Egnatia follows the Roman Via Egnatia, which connected Rome and Constantinople as one of the two most important roads in the Roman and Byzantine empires.

Although the location of the Via Egnatia in Thessaloniki was known when the metro line was planned, it was uncertain what else was buried nearby. The discovery of a Byzantine road at Venizelou station was a major archaeological find:  of the marble-paved and column-lined road was unearthed, with shops, other buildings, and plumbing which one scholar called "the Byzantine Pompeii". A crossroads, marked with a tetrapylon, was found at Venizelou where the Decumanus Maximus crossed a cardo (a north–south road). An additional  of the same road was discovered at the  station. Issues concerning archaeological finds and the display of artefacts in the metro system are more complex than similar issues surrounding the construction of the New Acropolis Museum.

Other important discoveries included a headless statue of Aphrodite, fourth-century-AD mosaics, a golden wreath, a bath complex, urban villas, and 50,000 coins. Artefacts from the 1917 fire were also found.

The discovery sparked controversy in Thessaloniki; Attiko Metro wanted to remove the antiquities and re-assemble them elsewhere, and the city's archaeological services wanted the company to alter the depth of the line and the station entrances. The city council sided with the archaeological services in 2015, three years after the metro was originally planned to begin service. Mayor Yiannis Boutaris took the case to the Council of State, Greece's highest administrative court. The Venizelou station will contain an open archaeological site, the world's first metro station to do so.

The archaeological excavations are currently budgeted at €132 million ($ million), compared with the original archaeological budget of €15 million ($ million), and employ 300 archaeologists. Over 300,000 artefacts have been unearthed to date. The archaeological work is being carried out by the Ministry of Culture and Sports' Ephorate of Prehistoric and Classical Antiquities and the Ephorate of Byzantine Antiquities.

In popular culture
Construction delays have made the Thessaloniki Metro the subject of a number of jokes in Greece. News satire websites such as  have satirised the metro on numerous occasions with stories such as "Thessaloniki Metro will operate on a 24-hour basis during the Christmas rush" and "Thessaloniki Metro enters its 763rd day of strike", and it has been cited in satirical lyrics by the Greek rapper Tus. Greek prime minister Alexis Tsipras joked about the delays at the 2018 Thessaloniki International Fair: "What's happening with the metro, guys? Will it get built here?"

See also

 List of metro systems
 Thessaloniki Urban Transport Organization
 Athens Metro

References

Sources 
 Archived information
 Thessaloniki Metro and the Athens Metro Extensions (Greek Ministry of Environment, Physical Planning and Public Works press release 2006-02-20)
 Conclusion of contract for the Thessaloniki metro (Greek Ministry of Environment, Physical Planning and Public Works press release 2006-04-07)

External links

 Attiko Metro SA  Thessaloniki Metro
 Maps

 
Thessaloniki (regional unit)
Rapid transit in Greece
Electric railways in Greece
Underground rapid transit in Greece
Proposed public transport in Europe
Transport in Thessaloniki
2023 in rail transport